Jürg Rohrbach (born 16 July 1931) is a Swiss former speed skater. He competed in two events at the 1956 Winter Olympics.

References

External links
 

1931 births
Possibly living people
Swiss male speed skaters
Olympic speed skaters of Switzerland
Speed skaters at the 1956 Winter Olympics